Tiro, also Thiro or Tira, is a Niger–Congo language in the Heiban family spoken in Kordofan, Sudan.

References

Heiban languages